Patience Ozokwor,  (born 14 September 1958) is a Nigerian veteran musician, fashion designer, gospel singer, and actress. She won the Best Supporting Actress 2012 & 2013 award at the 10th Africa Movie Academy Awards. She is known for taking the role of a wicked woman in some of her movies. Patience Ozokwor was among the top 100 Nigerians Honored by the government to celebrate the amalgamation of the northern and southern protectorates in 2014.

Early life
Patience Ozokwo was born in the village of Amaobo, Ngwo in present-day Enugu State, Nigeria, and attended Abimbola Gibson Memorial School in Lagos. Patience Ozokwor had a passion for acting ever since she was in primary school, where she would act in different stage plays. She later attended the Institute of Management and Technology Enugu, where Patience obtained a degree in fine and applied arts. Before starting as an actress, she was part of a Radio Drama. She took part in a soap opera by the Nigerian Television Authority (NTA) titled "Someone Cares". She was married at age 19 and has three biological children and five adopted ones, who all bear her name. Ozokwor became a widow in 2000 when she lost her husband.

Career 
She was an announcer and broadcaster on Radio Nigeria before she became an actress. She rose to fame from her role in the 1999 movie titled Authority and her first TV drama won a soap opera titled Someone Cares on the Nigerian Television Authority (NTA). Since her rise to fame, she proceeded to act in over 100 movies.

She recently starred in the Mo Abudu Netflix movie Chief Daddy (2018) and Chief Daddy 2: Going for Broke (2022) as Madam Pat.

Personal life 
She got married at the age of 19 and she lost her husband to a terminal disease. She has three biological children, five adopted children and grand children. She is also an ordained evangelist.

Filmography

References

External links 

1958 births
Living people
Actresses from Enugu State
Best Supporting Actress Africa Movie Academy Award winners
Igbo actresses
Members of the Order of the Niger
20th-century Nigerian actresses
Nigerian musicians
Nigerian actresses
Nigerian evangelists